The General of the Dead Army is a 1983 Italian drama film directed by Luciano Tovoli. It is based on the 1963 novel by Albanian author Ismail Kadare of the same name.

Cast
 Marcello Mastroianni as General Ariosto
 Anouk Aimée as Countess Betsy Mirafiore
 Michel Piccoli as Benetandi
 Gérard Klein as General Krotz
 Sergio Castellitto as The Expert
 Daniele Dublino as The Minister
 Carmine De Padova as L'ordonnance
 Roberto Miccoli as The Shepherd
 Cosimo Calabrese as The President
 Salvatore Buccolieri as The Old Man
 Vincenza D'Angela as The Woman

Other films based on the book
The Return of the Dead Army (Albanian: Kthimi i Ushtrise se Vdekur) is a 1989 Albanian film starring Bujar Lako, based on the novel, directed by Dhimitër Anagnosti.
Life and Nothing But (La Vie et rien d’autre) is a 1989 French film starring Philippe Noiret, based on the novel, directed by Bertrand Tavernier.

References

External links

1983 films
1983 drama films
Italian drama films
1980s Italian-language films
Films directed by Luciano Tovoli
Films based on historical novels
Films based on Albanian novels
Films with screenplays by Jean-Claude Carrière
1980s Italian films